Mount Stuart located at 29°30'32.0"S 142°01'08.0"E  is a civil parish of Tongowoko County, on the opposite bank of the Thomson Creek from the town of Tibooburra. The parish is east of Tibooburra.

The geography of the parish is mostly the flat, arid landscape of the Channel Country. The parish has a Köppen climate classification of BWh (Hot desert).

References

Parishes of Tongowoko County
Far West (New South Wales)